Joseph Rowe was an American football coach.  He was the head football coach at Kalamazoo College in Kalamazoo, Michigan, serving for one season, in 1903, and compiling a record of 6–2.

References

Year of birth missing
Year of death missing
19th-century births
20th-century deaths
Kalamazoo Hornets football coaches